There Is No 13 is a 1974 American surrealist drama film directed by William Sachs and starring Mark Damon. It was entered into the 24th Berlin International Film Festival.

Premise
During the Vietnam War, a soldier remembers the 12 women he has been with. But, there is no 13.

Cast
 Mark Damon as George Thomas
 Margaret Markov as Number Eleven
 Harvey Lembeck as Older George
 Jean Jennings as Number Twelve
 Lee Moore as Dr. Honneycutt
 Reuben Schafer as Mr. A.
 Bonnie Inch as Rosie

Reception
When the film screened at Berlin International Film Festival, it polarized the audiences due to it being American, dealing with the Vietnam war. During the screening, there were protests, with some people shouting and someone turning the light in the auditorium on and off a few times. A judge told Sachs that the film should have won a Golden Bear award "because it was the only unusual film" at the festival, and that it didn't only because the jury was worried about the public reaction to the winning film being so controversial.

Quotes

See also
 List of American films of 1974

References

External links

1974 films
1974 drama films
American independent films
American drama films
Vietnam War films
1970s English-language films
Films directed by William Sachs
1970s American films